Richard Lawrence ( – June 13, 1861) was an English-American house painter who was the first known person to attempt the assassination of a sitting president of the United States. Lawrence attempted to shoot President Andrew Jackson outside the United States Capitol on January 30, 1835. At trial, Lawrence was found not guilty by reason of insanity and spent the remainder of his life in insane asylums.

Early life
Lawrence was born in England, most likely around 1800 or 1801. His family emigrated to the United States when he was 12 years old and settled in Virginia, near Washington, D.C. Lawrence's childhood and early adult years were apparently normal as was his behavior. At his trial, he was described by acquaintances and relatives as a "relatively fine young boy" who was "reserved in his manner; but industrious and of good moral habits." Lawrence later found work as a house painter. Historians have speculated that Lawrence’s exposure to the toxic chemicals used in paint in the 1800s (including lead, antimony, chromates, sulfides and barium) may have contributed to his mental illness, which manifested itself when he was in his thirties. Lawrence began exhibiting dissociative behavior and violent tendencies, especially towards his siblings.

Mental illness
By November 1832, Lawrence's behavior and mental stability had inexplicably changed. He abruptly announced to his family that he was returning to England, and he left Washington shortly thereafter. He returned a month later telling his family he decided not to travel abroad as it was too cold. Shortly after returning, he again announced that he was returning to England to study landscape painting.

Lawrence left once again and briefly stayed in Philadelphia before returning home. He told his family that "unnamed persons" had prevented him from traveling abroad and that the U.S. government also disapproved of his plan to return to England. Lawrence also claimed that while he was in Philadelphia, he read several stories about himself in the newspaper that were critical of his travel plans and his character. Lawrence told his family that he had no choice but to return to Washington until he could afford to buy a ship and hire a captain who would sail the ship to England for him.

Around this time, Lawrence abruptly quit his house painting job. When questioned by his sister and brother-in-law, with whom he was living, Lawrence claimed that he did not need to work because the U.S. government owed him a large sum of money. Lawrence had come to believe that he was owed money because he was Richard III of England and owned two English estates. Lawrence became convinced that he was not receiving the money because of President Andrew Jackson's opposition to the Second Bank of the United States. He felt that if Jackson were no longer in office, Vice President Martin Van Buren would establish a national bank and allow Congress to pay him the money for his English estate claims.

Lawrence's personality and outward appearance changed dramatically around this time. Once conservatively dressed, Lawrence grew a mustache and began buying expensive and flamboyant clothing, which he would change three or four times a day. He took to standing in the doorway of his home for hours and gazing out into the street. Neighborhood children would jokingly address him as "King Richard", which typically pleased Lawrence, who failed to realize the children were teasing him. He also became paranoid and hostile towards others. On one occasion, he threatened to kill a maid who he thought was laughing at him. Lawrence also began verbally and physically abusing his family, mainly his sisters, over imagined slights. In one instance, he threatened to hit his sister with a paperweight because he believed that she had been talking about him. At Lawrence's trial, witnesses described the bizarre behavior that he exhibited. Several people testified that Lawrence would engage in nonsensical conversations with himself, and others stated that he would have laughing and cursing fits.

Assassination attempt

In the weeks leading up to the assassination attempt, Lawrence began observing Jackson's movements. Witnesses later testified that Lawrence was often seen sitting in his paint shop muttering to himself about Jackson. On Friday, January 30, 1835, the day of the assassination attempt, Lawrence was seen sitting in his paint shop with a book in his hand while laughing. Lawrence suddenly got up, left the shop and stated, "I'll be damned if I don't do it."

Later on that same day, Jackson was attending the funeral of South Carolina Representative Warren R. Davis at the U.S. Capitol. Lawrence originally planned to shoot Jackson as he entered the service but was unable to get close enough to him. However, by the time Jackson left the funeral, Lawrence had found a space near a pillar on the East Portico, where Jackson would pass. As Jackson walked by, Lawrence stepped out and fired his first pistol at Jackson's back; it misfired. Lawrence quickly made another attempt with his second pistol, but that also misfired. It was later determined that the weapons that he had chosen were noted for being vulnerable to moisture, and the weather on that date was humid and damp.

Lawrence's unsuccessful attempts were noticed by Jackson, who proceeded to beat him with his cane. The crowd, which included U.S. Representative Davy Crockett, eventually intervened and wrestled Lawrence into submission. Lawrence was the first person to attempt an assassination of a sitting U.S. president.

Trial and commitment
Lawrence was brought to trial on April 11, 1835, at the District of Columbia City Hall. The prosecuting attorney was Francis Scott Key. At his trial, Lawrence was prone to wild rants and he refused to recognize the legitimacy of the proceedings. At one point he said to the courtroom, "It is for me, gentlemen, to pass judgment on you, and not you upon me." After only five minutes of deliberation, the jury found Lawrence "not guilty by reason of insanity".

In the years following his acquittal, Lawrence was held by several institutions and hospitals. In 1855, he was committed to the newly opened Government Hospital for the Insane (later renamed St. Elizabeths Hospital), in Washington, D.C., where he remained until his death on June 13, 1861.

Aftermath
As with later assassinations, there was speculation that Lawrence was part of a conspiracy. While nobody denied Lawrence's involvement, many people, including Jackson, believed that he might have been supported in or put up to carrying out the assassination attempt by the President's political enemies. U.S. Senator (and Jackson's former vice president) John C. Calhoun made a statement on the Senate floor that he was not connected to the attack. Nevertheless, Jackson believed that Calhoun, an old enemy, was at the bottom of the attempt.

Jackson also suspected a former friend and supporter, Senator George Poindexter of Mississippi, who had used Lawrence to do some house painting a few months earlier. Because Poindexter was unable to convince his supporters in Mississippi that he was not involved in a plot against Jackson, he was defeated for re-election. However, no evidence was ever discovered that connected Lawrence with either Calhoun or Poindexter in a plot to kill Jackson.

References

Sources

External links
This Day In History: Andrew Jackson narrowly escapes assassination at History.com

1800 births
1861 deaths
19th-century English people
Andrew Jackson
Deaths in mental institutions
English emigrants to the United States
American failed assassins
Failed assassins of presidents of the United States
House painters
People acquitted by reason of insanity
Year of birth uncertain
Burials at Rock Creek Cemetery